Albert Lee Reeves Jr. (May 31, 1906 – April 15, 1987) was an American attorney, politician and businessman. He was a U.S. Representative from Missouri for one term from 1947 to 1949.

Early life 
Reeves was born in Steelville, Missouri, and attended public school in Kansas City, Missouri. He graduated from William Jewell College, Liberty, Missouri, in 1927. He taught at Baylor University in Waco, Texas, in 1927 and 1928, and was a student at Harvard University in 1928 and 1929. Reeves graduated from the University of Missouri Law School at Columbia in 1931.

Career 
He was admitted to the bar the same year and commenced practice in Kansas City, Missouri. He entered the United States Army Corps of Engineers on active duty in July 1942 as captain, Missouri River Division, and served in India, Burma, and China. He was promoted through the ranks to lieutenant colonel and relieved from active duty April 23, 1946, to resume the practice of law.

Reeves was elected as a Republican to the Eightieth Congress (January 3, 1947 – January 3, 1949). He failed to win reelection in 1948.

Later career and death 
After serving in Congress, Reeves practiced law in Kansas City, Missouri, and Washington, D.C., and was senior vice president at Utah Construction & Mining Co., San Francisco, California. He served as director and secretary of Marcona Corporation and Affiliates.

Reeves was a resident of Pauma Valley, California, until his death in La Jolla, California, on April 15, 1987. He was cremated and his ashes buried at St. Francis Church, Pauma Valley.

References

External links

 

1906 births
1987 deaths
Baylor University faculty
Harvard University alumni
United States Army colonels
Republican Party members of the United States House of Representatives from Missouri
20th-century American politicians
People from Crawford County, Missouri
University of Missouri School of Law alumni
California Republicans